The 2020 Swedish Indoor Athletics Championships was the 55th edition of the national championship in indoor track and field for Sweden. It was held on 22 and 23 February at the Telekonsult Arena in Växjö.

The national indoor championship in combined track and field events was held separately on 1 and 2 February at the Sollentuna friidrottshall in Sollentuna Municipality.

Results

Men

Women

References

Results
ISM 2020 Växjö 22-23 februari . telekonsultarena. Retrieved 2020-03-03.
ISM IJSM IUSM Mångkamp 2020 . turebergfriidrott.se. Retrieved 2020-03-03.

External links 
 Official website of the Swedish Athletics Association

2020
Athl
Swedish Championships
Athletics Championships
Sport in Växjö